1,4-Bis(diphenylphosphino)butane (dppb) is an organophosphorus compound with the formula (Ph2PCH2CH2)2. It is less commonly used in coordination chemistry than other diphosphine ligands such as dppe. It is a white solid that is soluble in organic solvents.

Coordination complexes
Nickel complexes in which the ligand is bidentate or monodentate are known.
Palladium complexes containing dppb are used in a variety of catalytic reactions.
The ligand's natural bite angle is 94° in its bidentate coordination mode.

Related compounds
1,2-Bis(dimethylphosphino)ethane
Bis(diphenylphosphino)methane
1,3-Bis(diphenylphosphino)propane

References

Chelating agents
Diphosphines
Phenyl compounds
1,4-Butanediyl compounds